The following is a list of congress people of Peru for the parliamentary period of 2006–2010.

Political parties

Politicians

References 

Congresspeople of Peru
Congresspeople